Sarbendra Nath Shukla is a Nepalese politician, belonging to the Loktantrik Samajwadi Party currently serving as the member of the 2nd Federal Parliament of Nepal. In the 2022 Nepalese general election, he won the election from Rupandehi 4 (constituency).

References

Living people
Nepal MPs 2022–present
Members of the 2nd Nepalese Constituent Assembly
Nepal MPs 1994–1999
Loktantrik Samajwadi Party, Nepal politicians
Rastriya Prajatantra Party politicians
Terai Madhesh Loktantrik Party politicians
Rastriya Janata Party Nepal politicians
1949 births